The British American Football Referees' Association (BAFRA) is the organisational body for American Football Referees in Britain. BAFRA is affiliated to the British American Football Association.

BAFRA was established in 1984 and provides game officials for American Football games played in the British Leagues. BAFRA officials are eligible to officiate in International Federation of American Football fixtures if selected to do so and in recent years BAFRA has provided personnel for the chain crews at NFL International Series games played at Wembley Stadium.

Association Governance
There 8 Board Directors of BAFRA meeting formally four times per year plus several working committees are convened during the year as required. The association has five stated objectives:
 To improve the standard of officiating by training and examination, and by any other means
 To enable all American football games in Britain to have neutral officials 
 To promote and uphold the status of officials both collectively and individually
 To co-operate and to cultivate good relations with all bodies concerned with American football, for the betterment of the game 
 To take such action or make such representation as an Association, or in conjunction with others as may be considered desirable, in the interests of American football in Britain in general or for the benefit of officials and officiating in particular

Training
The Director of Training is responsible for the oversight of training and development of officials under BAFRA.  Training includes both formal seminars and presentations provided at The Annual Convention (typically in March or April), plus regional events for all levels.  

Initial Training

During the initial associate training program all partnered with an experienced official - a Mentor - who provides one to one training of rules and mechanics.  Additionally new officials are required to gain on field experience over a minimum of 10 competitive games where various aspects of what they have learned are tested and developed.  The Mentor, lead Referee and other officials provide feedback during this process.  Both the theoretical and practical performance of the new official is assessed at the end of the 10 game apprenticeship and should the appropriate standard be reached qualification is awarded.  

Elite Program and Training

Each year BAFRA Selection Committee identify a panel of approximately 25 of the highest performing officials for the Elite Programme who are then assigned to the most prestigious competitive games in UK including Britbowl, BUCS Premier League Finals and may be promoted to IFAF level officials.

The John Slavin Trophy
John Slavin was a long-serving BAFRA official and also a director of the association, who died in October 2005. In his memory BAFRA dedicated an annual award to be made to any UK team that shows commitment to improving the game experience for players and fans, as well as officials. The criteria for the award is decided at the start of each season by the rules committee to reflect varying aspects of game management that would benefit from improvement.

A full list of National winners of the trophy may be found at: https://www.bafra.info/info/jst/index.php

Officials Awards
Since 2015, annual awards have been made to the Official of the Year and the Upcoming Official of the Year (called the Alan Wilson Award). A list of winners and the criteria applied may be found on the BAFRA website.

Weekly newsletter
Within its website BAFRA publishes an open weekly online newsletter called Newsflash that includes items of interest, notices of appointment, game reports, disciplinary decisions and any rule changes. Whilst the purpose of Newsflash is primarily to inform BAFRA members, it is made available to the general public via the BAFRA website.

Social Media Channels
Facebook

Instagram

LinkedIn

Twitter

YouTube

References

External links
BAFRA homepage

American football organizations
American football in the United Kingdom

Sports officiating
Sports professional associations
Professional associations based in the United Kingdom
Sports organizations established in 1984
1984 establishments in the United Kingdom
Sports organisations of the United Kingdom